Altaposten is a Norwegian daily newspaper, published in Alta, Norway.

History and profile
Altaposten was founded in 1969, and its first editor was Øystein Dalland. From 1988 Ulf Jørgensen edited the newspaper, and since 2001 the editor-in-chief has been Rolf Edmund Lund. Altaposten was the owner of the Sami newspaper Áššu until its merge with Min Áigi to form Ávvir, which is owned by Altaposten together with Finnmark Dagblad.

Altaposten had a circulation of 4,793 copies in 2012. The 2013 circulation of the paper was 4,535 copies.

References

External links
 Official website

Publications established in 1969
1969 establishments in Norway
Daily newspapers published in Norway
Norwegian-language newspapers
Polaris Media